The 1954 Swissair Convair CV-240 crash occurred on 19 June 1954 when a Swissair Convair CV-240 ditched in the English Channel off Folkestone, Kent, having run out of fuel. Although all on board survived the ditching of the aircraft, three people drowned, as they could not swim and there were no lifejackets carried on board the aircraft. At the time of the accident, these were not required to be carried on flights where the time over water was less than 30 minutes flying time.

Aircraft
The accident aircraft was Convair CV-240 HB-IRW, c/n 61. The aircraft had first flown in 1948. Named Ticino, the aircraft had entered service with KLM and was sold to Swissair on 28 November 1953 for CHF 2,270,000.

Accident
The accident flight was a scheduled international passenger flight from Cointrin Airport, Geneva, Switzerland to Heathrow Airport, London, United Kingdom. Prior to performing the accident flight, the aircraft had operated a flight from London to Geneva. The port engine then stopped and the propeller was feathered. The pilot initiated a diversion to RAF Manston.
The starboard engine then stopped too.

Four British Railways staff rowed a boat out to the scene of the accident, which they reached in about 30 minutes. Lifeboats from Dover and Dungeness and helicopters from RAF Manston and  also searched for survivors. A sixth survivor was rescued by Southern Queen, with the other five being transferred to her. They were landed in Folkestone and taken to the Royal Victoria Hospital. Three of the passengers survived the ditching, but later drowned.

The body of one of the victims was discovered at St Margaret's Bay on 27 June. Another victim's body was washed up in the Netherlands. The body of the third victim had not been found by the time an inquest was held in August 1954 at Ashford, Kent. A verdict of "misadventure" was returned in the case of the two victims whose bodies had been recovered. Although the skill of the pilot in effecting the ditching was praised by the Coroner, he was also criticised both flight crew for not going to the assistance of the passengers after the ditching.

Investigation
The accident was investigated by the Ministry of Transport and Civil Aviation. It was discovered that the aircraft had not been refuelled at Geneva before departing for London. The aircraft held  of fuel, but departed from Geneva with what was left of this quantity after the previous flight from London had been performed. The fuel had been ordered, but was not delivered to the aircraft. The captain apparently did not notice any discrepancy in the gauges on departure from Geneva.

Consequences
Both flight crew were suspended by Swissair following the accident. After the cause of the accident was established, they were dismissed. As a result of the accident, Swissair subsequently carried lifesaving equipment on all cross-Channel flights, even though regulations then in force did not require this. Lifesaving equipment only needed to be carried on flights where the time over water exceeded 30 minutes.

Casualties
The nationalities of the casualties were -

References

Aviation accidents and incidents in 1954
Aviation accidents and incidents in Kent
Folkestone
1954 disasters in the United Kingdom
Airliner accidents and incidents involving ditching
Airliner accidents and incidents caused by fuel exhaustion
Accidents and incidents involving the Convair CV-240 family
1954
History of the English Channel
1950s in Kent
June 1954 events in the United Kingdom